ADX, AdX, Adx, etc. may refer to:

Business and technology
 Abu Dhabi Securities Exchange
 Adams Express Company, stock symbol
 ADX (file format), a streamed audio format
 Authenticated Data Experiment, an early release of Bluesky's decentralized social network protocol
 Average directional movement index, a technical indicator of trend strength in prices of a financial instrument such as a stock or bond
 DoubleClick Ad Exchange (AdX), an ad exchange platform merged into Google Ad Manager
 Intel ADX, add-carry instruction extensions in the x86 microprocessor architecture

Medicine
 Adrenal ferredoxin, a small iron-sulfur protein in animals including humans
 Adrenalectomy, the surgical removal of one or both adrenal glands or the state of having had one or both removed

Music
 ADX, alternative spelling of British punk band The Adicts
 ADX, a French heavy-metal band.

Other
 Administrative maximum or "supermax" prisons in the United States
 United States Penitentiary, Florence ADX, the federal supermax prison in Florence, Colorado
 Alpha Delta Chi, an American nation-wide Christian sorority
 Amdo Tibetan language, from its SIL language code
 Leuchars Station, United Kingdom, formerly RAF Leuchars, a British army installation in eastern Scotland (from its IATA airport code)